Parvēz,  Pērvaz or Parvīz (meaning "fortunate, victorious";  Parvēz, also ʾplwyc Abarvēz/Aparvēz), is a Persian male given name, mostly popular in Iran, Central Asia, South Asia and among Azeris. It is also a common surname.

Note:
Parvēz, Parvez, Parvīz, Parwez, Parwiz, Pervaiz, Pervaz, Pervez, Perviz , Parvase or Purvez are usually the same name but with different spellings. Furthermore, pronunciation between these different spellings are generally extremely similar or identical. All of these are ultimately derived from the Middle Persian name Peroz, of which 
there are many variations, such as Piruz, Phiroze, Feroze, etc.

Given name
Notable people who have this given name include:
Parviz (Khosrow II), the twenty-second Sassanid King of Persia also known as Khosrow Parviz or Khosrow "The Victorious One" or "The Undefeatable" (reigning from 590 to 628 CE).
Parvaiz Mehdi Qureshi, the former Chief of Air Staff of Pakistan Air Force
Parvez Butt (born 1942), Pakistani nuclear engineer and former chairman of Pakistan Atomic Energy Commission  2001–2006 (PAEC)
Parvez Hossain Emon, Bangladeshi cricketer
Parvez Imroz, human rights lawyer and a civil rights activist in Srinagar, the capital of Jammu and Kashmir
Parvez Qadir, British actor
Parvez Sharma, Indian film director
Parviz Abnar, sound recordist
Parviz Fannizadeh, Iranian actor
Parviz Ghelichkhani, footballer
Parviz Mazloumi, football manager
Parviz Meshkatian, Iranian Musician
Parviz Moin, physicist
Parviz Natel-Khanlari, professor
Pierre Omidyar (born Parviz Omidyar), entrepreneur and founder of eBay
Parviz Parastui, Iranian actor
Parviz Sayyad, Iranian actor
Parviz Sobirov, Tajikistani jodoka
Pervez Hoodbhoy, Pakistani professor of nuclear physics
Pervez Kambaksh, journalist
Pervez Jamil Mir, Pakistani TV anchorperson
Pervez Musharraf, (1943-2023) former President of Pakistan and Chief of Army Staff of Pakistan Army
Pervez Sajjad, former Pakistani cricketer
Pervez Taufiq, songwriter and lead singer for band Living Syndication

Middle name
Ashfaq Parvez Kayani, previous Chief of Army Staff of the Pakistan Army
Chaudhry Pervaiz Elahi, former candidate for Prime Minister of Pakistan and former Chief Minister of Punjab, Pakistan
Imran Pervez Awan, Pakistani born American cricketer
Raja Pervaiz Ashraf, former Prime Minister of Pakistan
Raja Nadir Pervez Khan, Pakistani politician
Shahid Parvez Khan, Sitar player of Hindustani Classical Music
Muhammad Parviz Mirza, second son of Mughal emperor Jahangir
Muhammad Parvez Gangua, Bangladeshi film actor

Surname
 Ahmed Pervez, Pakistani modernist painter 
 Alex Parvis, English guitarist of Area 11
 Ansar Pervaiz, Pakistani nuclear scientist, current chairman of the Pakistan Atomic Energy Commission (PAEC)
 Anwar Pervez, British businessman
 Aqsa Parvez (1991–2007), victim of an alleged honour killing in Mississauga, Ontario, Canada
 Arshad Pervez, Pakistani cricketer
 Fariha Pervez, Pakistani musician
 Ghulam Ahmed Pervez, Islamic scholar
 Imran Parvez (born 1977), Bangladeshi cricketer 
 Saleem Pervez, Pakistani cricketer
 Tariq Pervez, Pakistani policeman, director-general of Pakistan's Federal Investigation Agency
 Yunus Parvez (1931–2007), Bollywood character actor
 Zeeshan Parwez, Pakistani musician

Other
Parviz Khan border point

Notes

External links 
Behind the Name: Iranian Names

Surnames
Persian masculine given names